Angeli Foods, also known as Angeli's Central Market or Angeli's Super Valu, was an American grocery store founded in Iron River, Michigan. Opened in 1917 by Italian immigrant Alfred Angeli, the company grew to encompass several stores dotted across in the Upper Peninsula of Michigan. Angeli Foods remained under family ownership for a total of three generations until its sale in 2022.

History 
Italian immigrant Alfred Angeli founded Angeli Foods in 1917 at 402 W. Adams St. in the-then quickly growing mining community of Iron River, Michigan. It was the first self-service grocery store to open in the Upper Peninsula of Michigan, the first to offer a frozen food locker, and the first to offer a five-day workweek. In addition, they were the Upper Peninsula's first independent retailer to offer profit sharing and medical insurance.

Early in Angeli Foods' existence, it delivered groceries around Iron River using a 1924 Ford Model TT truck. They retained it as an in-store display after it was retired. According to Angeli Foods' official history, the company was successful enough to branch into several other industries, including a  farm, the Iron Inn hotel, a feed warehouse, and pet supplies.

After Alfred Angeli's death in 1950, his grocery store remained within the family for two more generations. Alfred's son Libero worked quickly to establish a new Iron River store location, on which construction began in 1953. 

The 1960s and 1970s were a time of expansion for the Angeli family. They helped develop and anchored Riverside Plaza, Iron River's first shopping center, with a  store a short distance east of the town. By 1973, Angeli's was grossing $7.4 million in revenue, and Libero won the Small Business Administration's "Small Businessman of the Year for Michigan" award for his work in developing the Upper Peninsula. By then, Angeli Foods had opened or acquired several other stores in the region, including:

  Menominee, Michigan:
 A  store, opened in 1967 or 1972; it was closed in the course of opening a larger location
 A  store, opened in the M&M Plaza in 1983 as a SuperValu County Market; it was later expanded to 
 Marinette, Wisconsin: a  store along Roosevelt Road that opened in 1992; it would eventually include an associated gas station
 Escanaba, Michigan: a Kitchen-Pantry convenience store at 1505 Washington Ave

In 2013, third-generation owner Fred Angeli was given the Michigan Grocers Association's first Al Kessel Outstanding Achievement Award. In the following year, Angeli Foods began offering organic food at their store in Menominee. They sold their grocery locations in Menominee and Marinette to Jack's Fresh Market in 2016, leaving only their original Iron River location and the Marinette gas station. The latter was sold by mid-2017.

As of 2019, the last remaining Angeli Foods store in Iron River employed over a hundred people with additional temporary workers taken on during the busier summer. The location, noted for its unusually expansive array of Italian products, had previously been lauded as an "extraordinary market" by Explorer's Guide. The travel guide added that its variety of fresh food options seemed "entirely out of place for tiny Iron River." Its non-grocery operations included an attached Verizon mobile phone store, a UPS parcel drop-off and pick-up location, dry cleaning, a Stormy Kromer outlet center, and a sports store. The latter replaced an Angeli-run video rental store in 2017 due to the rise in video streaming.

At the beginning of the 2020 COVID-19 pandemic in the United States, Angeli Foods worked with volunteers to allow customers to phone in their orders for contactless pickup at the store. A year later, it launched a website where customers could order their groceries for later pickup.

Related businesses 
Mike Leonard Angeli, part of a separate branch of the Angeli family, opened an Angeli grocery store in Marquette, Michigan in 1959. The  building was located near the intersection of Washington and 7th Streets. This location closed in 1975 after Angeli became a founding and anchor tenant in the Marquette Mall complex. Angeli's new purpose-built store there was  large and carried SuperValu branding. It opened in 1973 and closed due to an increasingly competitive local grocery scene in 1989.

Sale 
In March 2022, Angeli Foods announced that it had reached a tentative agreement to sell itself for an undisclosed amount to Miner's, Inc., the owner and operator of Super One Foods, a chain of grocery store located in the Upper Peninsula of Michigan, Wisconsin, and Minnesota. As part of the arrangement, Angeli's last extant store in Iron River would be rebranded and become the thirty-second Super One. The sale concluded in May, and the store was closed for a day to begin the changeover.

Footnotes

Endnotes

External links 
 Official website (archived)
 

Defunct supermarkets of the United States
Defunct companies based in Michigan
American companies established in 1917
Retail companies established in 1917
1917 establishments in Michigan